Vishnu Kumar Modi is an Indian politician.  He was elected to the Lok Sabha, the lower house of the Parliament of India, from Ajmer, Rajasthan as a member of the Indian National Congress.

References

External links
 Official biographical sketch in Parliament of India website

1950 births
Living people
India MPs 1984–1989
Lok Sabha members from Rajasthan
Indian National Congress politicians